Vávra (feminine: Vávrová) is a Czech-language surname. Notable people include:

 Dana Vávrová (1967 2009), Czech-German actress
 Daniel Vávra (born 1972), Czech video game writer, director and designer
 Greg Vavra (born 1961), Canadian football player
 Iva Vávrová (born 1943), Czechoslovak sprint canoeist
 Jiří Vávra (born 1975), Czech footballer
 Joe Vavra (born 1959), American baseball coach
 Josef Vávra, Czech ice hockey player
 Lawrence Vavra (born 1977), American music manager
 Michaela Vávrová, Czech rower
 Otakar Vávra (1911–2011), Czech film director and screenwriter
 Robert Vavra (born 1935), American photographer
 Stanislav Vávra (born 1993), Czech footballer
 Terrin Vavra (born 1997), American baseball player
 Vladimír Vávra, Czech wrestler
 Zdeněk Vávra (1891–1947), Czech fencer
 Zdeňka Vávrová, Czech astronomer

Czech-language surnames